The Vice Chief of the Naval Staff (V.C.N.S.)  was a senior appointment in the Royal Navy usually a three-star rank and had a NATO ranking code of OF-8 that existed from 1941 to 1985 and was a member of the Admiralty Naval Staff.

History
In October 1941 the post of Vice-Chief of the Naval Staff was created when the Admiralty abolished the title of Deputy Chief of the Naval Staff in  line with changes that were also taking place within the army and air force. It was essentially the same role as the Deputy Chief of the Naval Staff: the post holder initially was the operational head of the Royal Navy and reported directly to the First Sea Lord.

In 1946 the office of the Deputy Chief of the Naval Staff was revived and the Vice Chief of the Naval Staff from that point reported to the Deputy Chief of the Naval Staff.

Following internal re-structuring within the Ministry of Defence the position of Vice Chief of the Naval Staff was abolished in 1985.

Vice Chiefs of the Naval Staff
Vice Chiefs of the Naval Staff included: 
Note: reports to the First Sea Lord from 1941 to 1946  then reports to the DCNS from 1947 until 1985

See also
Assistant Chief of the Naval Staff
Deputy Chief of the Naval Staff
First Sea Lord
Second Sea Lord
Third Sea Lord
Fourth Sea Lord
Fifth Sea Lord

References

General references
Primary source for this article is by Harley Simon, Lovell Tony, (2017), Vice Chief of Naval Staff, http://www.dreadnoughtproject.org.
http://www.dreadnoughtproject.org/Assistant Chief of Naval Staff
http://www.gulabin.com/Royal Navy - Senior Appointments

External links

Vice chiefs of staff
V
Admiralty during World War II
1941 establishments in the United Kingdom
1985 disestablishments in the United Kingdom